The name Josie has been used to name three tropical cyclones worldwide: twice by PAGASA in the Western Pacific Ocean and once by the Fiji Meteorological Service (FMS) in the South Pacific.

In the Western Pacific, where it replaced Jose after 2014:
 Tropical Depression 13W (2018) (13W, Josie) – short-lived system which peaked as a tropical storm on JTWC; brought significant flooding to several parts of the Philippines.
 Typhoon Nanmadol (2022) (T2214, 16W, Josie) – an intense typhoon that became the strongest tropical cyclone of 2022, made landfall in Japan.

In the South Pacific:
 Cyclone Josie (2018) – moved near Tonga and claimed the lives of 4 people, with another person remaining missing.

In the South-West Indian Ocean:
 Cyclone Josie (1997) – 

Pacific typhoon set index articles
South Pacific cyclone set index articles